Jalalabad Gas Transmission and Distribution System Limited is a Bangladeshi state-owned gas distribution company in the Sylhet Division. Nazmul Ahsan is a Bangladesh government owned natural gas distribution company in the Sylhet Division. It is one of the three largest gas distribution companies in Bangladesh; the other two are Karnaphuli Gas Distribution Company Limited and Titas Gas Transmission and Distribution Company Limited. Nazmul Ahsan is the Chairman of Jalalabad Gas Transmission and Distribution System Limited.

History 
Jalalabad Gas Transmission and Distribution System Limited was established on 1 December 1986. It started with 1.5 billion taka paid up capital. The gas distributed by the company is supplied by Petrobangla.

In July 2005, Ariful Haque Chowdhury, who had been nominated by Finance Minister M. Saifur Rahman, from the post of director of Jalalabad Gas Transmission and Distribution System Limited.

In July 2007, Mashuk Uddin Ahmed, union president of the Jalalabad Gas Transmission and Distribution System Limited, was sentenced to seven years imprisonment.

Jalalabad Gas Transmission and Distribution System Limited selected ZICOM Equipment Pte. Ltd to supply them with gas meters in 2011.

The deputy general manager of the Jalalabad Gas Transmission and Distribution System Limited filed a case against Abdur Rahman, a Sylhet-based businessman, accusing him of trying to illegally occupy the land of the company in October 2014.

Jalalabad Gas Transmission and Distribution System Limited asked Shahjalal Fertiliser Factory to stop using it's gas due to a shortage of gas in the country in February 2018.

In June 2020, Jalalabad Gas Transmission and Distribution System Limited proposed to the government to convert 50 thousand domestic connections to a new prepaid meter system from the previous fixed monthly rate. Institution of Engineers, Bangladesh protested the appointment of administration cadre officer in charge of Jalalabad Gas Transmission and Distribution System Limited which they argued should have gone to a technical cadre. It also got into a dispute with the Holcim Group which alleged Jalalabad was charging more than the agreed amount for their gas. The gas company had signed a deal with Holcim Group to supply gas to its cement factory in Sunamganj. In its 34th Annual General Meeting the company announced the company had made a profit of 2.5 billion taka.

Jalalabad Gas Transmission and Distribution System Limited announced a plan to establish a mechanism to detect gas leaks in August 2021 it partnership with ZICOM Equipment Pte. Ltd, a Singapore-based company whose Managing Director Rashed Choudhury was present at the announcement. Bangladesh Securities and Exchange Commission asked Jalalabad Gas Transmission and Distribution System Limited to list on the stock market. Legal advisor of the company, Justice Hasan Foez Siddique, was appointed Chief Justice of Bangladesh in 2021. It signed a memorandum of understanding with the Bangladesh Investment Development Authority.

In January 2022, Jalalabad Gas Transmission and Distribution System Limited along with other state owned distributors demanded an increase in gas prices. The Ministry of Finance had been demanding the  Energy and Mineral Resources Division increase the revenue collected from energy sales. A public hearing was held by the Bangladesh Energy Regulatory Commission to discuss the question of raising prices. It had proposed a more than 200 percent increase in the price of gas.

References 

1986 establishments in Bangladesh
Government-owned companies of Bangladesh
Organisations based in Sylhet